Koronka  is a village in the administrative district of Gmina Żelazków, within Kalisz County, Greater Poland Voivodeship, in west-central Poland.

The village has a population of 90.

References

Koronka